Juan Ramón Solís Barragán (born June 14, 1984) is a retired Panamanian football midfielder.

Club career
Juanra played in the Pan de Azúcar youth teams and made his senior debut in 1999 for Sporting '89, then played for San Francisco and moved abroad to play in Colombia with Envigado in 2005 and for Salvadoran side Águila in February 2007. He returned for another lengthy spell at San Francisco and moved to Sporting San Miguelito in January 2013, only to leave them in October 2013 after he claimed the club owed him money. He was snapped up by Plaza Amador in January 2014.

He retired in December 2014, after several knee injuries had hampered his career.

International career
Solís participated in the 2003 FIFA World Youth Championship held in the United Arab Emirates as captain of the first Panama representative football team who qualified to the final phase of any football World Cup.

He made his senior debut for Panama in a February 2003 UNCAF Nations Cup match El Salvador and has earned a total of 25 caps, scoring 2 goals. He represented his country in 4 FIFA World Cup qualification matches and played seven matches at the 2003 and 2005 UNCAF Nations Cups.

His final international was an October 2010 friendly match against Cuba.

International goals
Scores and results list. Panama's goal tally first.

Honors
Club
ANAPROF (2): 2007 (A), 2008 (A)

References

External links
 

1984 births
Living people
People from Chitré
Association football midfielders
Panamanian footballers
Panama international footballers
2003 UNCAF Nations Cup players
2005 UNCAF Nations Cup players
San Francisco F.C. players
Envigado F.C. players
C.D. Águila footballers
Sporting San Miguelito players
C.D. Plaza Amador players
Categoría Primera A players
Panamanian expatriate footballers
Expatriate footballers in Colombia
Expatriate footballers in El Salvador
Expatriate footballers in Belize
Premier League of Belize players
Belize Defence Force FC players